L26 may refer to:
 60S ribosomal protein L26
 Aero Commander L-26, an American liaison aircraft
 Buick L26 engine, a V6 automobile engine
 Hesperia Airport, in California
 , a submarine of the Royal Navy
 Klemm L 26, a German trainer aircraft
 Lectionary 26
 Nissan L26 engine, a straight-six automobile engine
 , a destroyer of the Polish Navy